John Palmer Parker (29 November 1902 – 9 August 1984) was an English cricketer. Parker was a right-handed batsman.

Parker made his first-class debut for Hampshire in the 1926 County Championship against Northamptonshire. Parker played 44 first-class matches for Hampshire between 1926 and 1933, with his final match for the county coming against Somerset. In his 44 matches for the county he scored 1,117 runs at a batting average of 17.45, with four half centuries and a single century score of 156 against Kent in 1926. With the ball Parker took 6 wickets at a bowling average of 43.00, with best figures of 2–14. In the field Parker took a total of 21 catches for the county.

As well as playing first-class cricket for Hampshire, he also represented LH Tennyson's XI in two first-class matches against Jamaica on their tour of the West Indies in 1927. Parker also played for the Gentlemen in a single Gentlemen v Players fixture in 1927.

Parker died at Warblington, Hampshire on 9 August 1984.

External links
John Parker at Cricinfo
John Parker at CricketArchive
Matches and detailed statistics for John Parker

1902 births
1984 deaths
Cricketers from Portsmouth
English cricketers
Hampshire cricketers
Gentlemen cricketers
English cricketers of 1919 to 1945
L. H. Tennyson's XI cricket team